NK Jarun Zagreb are a football team from Jarun neighborhood of Zagreb, Croatia, currently playing in the 2. HNL, the Croatian second division. They play their home games at the Jarkas pitch on Ogulinska Street.

Jarun was a neighborhood club for many years but achieved a double promotion to begin playing in the third division for the 2018-19 season. Many of the club's players graduated from the Jarun football school.

The HDZ, one of Croatia's major political parties, was founded at the club's sporting grounds in 1989, with Franjo Tuđman elected party president.

Current squad

References

External links
Official website

Football clubs in Croatia
Jarun
1921 establishments in Croatia
Association football clubs established in 1921